Elliott Nugent (September 20, 1896 – August 9, 1980) was an American actor, playwright, writer, and film director.

Biography
Nugent was born in Dover, Ohio, the son of actor J.C. Nugent. He attended Ohio State University. He successfully made the transition from silent film to sound film. He directed The Cat and the Canary (1939), starring Bob Hope and Paulette Goddard. He also directed the Hope films Never Say Die (1939) and My Favorite Brunette (1947).

Nugent was a college classmate (and lifelong friend) of fellow Ohioan James Thurber. Together, they wrote the Broadway play The Male Animal (1940) in which Nugent starred with Gene Tierney. He also directed the 1942 film version of The Male Animal, starring Henry Fonda and Olivia de Havilland. 

Nugent was the brother-in-law of actor Alan Bunce of Ethel and Albert fame.

He died in his sleep at his New York home. His papers are archived at the New York Public Library.

Partial Stage Works 

 The Poor Nut (1925)
 The Male Animal (1940)
 Tomorrow the World (1943)
 Voice of the Turtle (1945)

Partial filmography

 Headlines (1925) - Roger Hillman
 The Single Standard (1929) - Party Boy (uncredited)
 Wise Girls (1929) - Kempy
 So This Is College (1929) - Eddie
 Not So Dumb (1930) - Gordon
 The Sins of the Children (1930) - Johnnie Wagenkampf
 The Unholy Three (1930) (also writer, with J.C. Nugent) - Hector
 Romance (1930) - Harry
 For the Love o' Lil (1930) - Sandy Jenkins
 The Virtuous Husband (1931) - Daniel Curtis
 The Last Flight (1931) - Francis
 The Mouthpiece (1932, director)
 Life Begins (1932, co-director)
 Whistling in the Dark (1933, director)
 Three-Cornered Moon (1933, director) - Stock Broker (uncredited)
 If I Were Free (1933, director)
 Two Alone (1934, director)
 Strictly Dynamite (1934, director) - Performer (uncredited) (unbilled)
 She Loves Me Not (1934, director)
 Enter Madame (1935, director)
 Splendor (1935, director)
 Wives Never Know (1936, director)
 It's All Yours (1937)
 Thunder in the City (1937) - Casey (uncredited)
 Professor Beware (1938, director)
 Give Me a Sailor (1938, director)
 Never Say Die (1939, director)
 The Cat and the Canary (1939, director)
 Nothing But the Truth (1941, director)
 The Male Animal (1942, director)
 The Crystal Ball (1943, director)
 Stage Door Canteen (1943) - Himself
 Up in Arms (1944, director)
 My Favorite Brunette (1947, director)
 Welcome Stranger (1947, director) - Dr. Morton (uncredited)
 My Girl Tisa (1948, director) - Man on Boat (uncredited)
 Mr. Belvedere Goes to College (1949, director)
 The Great Gatsby (1949, director)
 The Skipper Surprised His Wife (1950, director)
 My Outlaw Brother (1951, director) - Ranger Captain (uncredited)
 Just for You (1952, director)

References

External links

 
 
 
 Elliott Nugent papers, 1916-1965, held by the Billy Rose Theatre Division, New York Public Library for the Performing Arts

1896 births
1980 deaths
20th-century American male actors
People from Dover, Ohio
Film directors from Ohio
American male film actors
20th-century American dramatists and playwrights
American male stage actors
Writers from Ohio
Male actors from Ohio